Tariq Mohammed Salih  (1 January 1938 – 8 February 1963) was an Iraqi footballer who played as a forward.

He played four matches and scored two goals for Iraq in the 1960 Olympics qualification against Lebanon.

Career statistics

International goals
Scores and results list Iraq's goal tally first.

References

1938 births
1963 deaths
Iraqi footballers
Sportspeople from Baghdad
Association football forwards
Iraq international footballers